Braeburn High School is a private international school located on Gitanga Road in the Lavington suburb of Nairobi, Kenya.

History 
The school was founded in 1968 and was called Braeburn House International School.

In 1979 the school consisted of one classroom block and a two-storey house. The Early Years unit and the Year 1 block had no roof at the time. The children have always worn a purple uniform.

A sixth form centre was opened in 2010, allowing pupils to complete their entire school education from 3–18 at the school.

Operations 
The school follows British National Curriculum and has over 300 students.

Adjacent to the school is Braeburn School, a primary school.  These are owned by the Braeburn Group, which also operates Braeburn College (Nairobi), Mombasa International School, Kisumu International School and Braeburn School Arusha (in Tanzania).

The school motto is summum appeto, a motto it shares with other schools in the Braeburn Group, which is Latin for 'Seeking the Top'.

See also 

 Education in Kenya
 List of international schools
 List of schools in Kenya

References

External links 
 Braeburn High School

International high schools
International schools in Nairobi
High schools and secondary schools in Kenya
1968 establishments in Kenya
Educational institutions established in 1968